Qezel Dash or Qezeldash may refer to:
 Qezel Dash-e Olya
 Qezel Dash-e Sofla